Daegan may refer to:

 Daegan,  a mountain range and watershed crest line of the Korean Peninsula, such as Baekdudaegan in Korean language
 Daegan, a name for some government post in Goryeo and Joseon